Group A of the 2000 Fed Cup Europe/Africa Zone Group I was one of four pools in the Europe/Africa Zone Group I of the 2000 Fed Cup. Four teams competed in a round robin competition, with the top team advancing to the knockout stage.

Netherlands vs. Turkey

Bulgaria vs. Sweden

Netherlands vs. Sweden

Bulgaria vs. Turkey

Netherlands vs. Bulgaria

Sweden vs. Turkey

  failed to win any ties in the pool, and thus was relegated to Group II in 2001, where they placed first in their pool of five, and thus advanced back to Group I for 2002.

See also
Fed Cup structure

References

External links
 Fed Cup website

2000 Fed Cup Europe/Africa Zone